Ace Against Odds is the 2016 biography of the Indian professional tennis player Sania Mirza. The book is her official biography chronicling her journey to becoming one of India and world's top female tennis player. The book also contains some memorable encounters of the player on and off the court and the people and relationships that have contributed to her growth as a person and a sportsperson.

The book was released at the hands of Shah Rukh Khan at a function in Hyderabad in July 2016.

See also
 Sania Mirza
 Tennis in India
 List of autobiographies by Indians

References

2016 non-fiction books
Indian autobiographies
English-language books
Tennis books
HarperCollins books